Bay City State Park (previously Bay City State Recreation Area) is a  state park located on the shore of Saginaw Bay near Bay City in Bay County, Michigan, United States. The Tobico Marsh, one of the largest remaining freshwater, coastal wetlands on the Great Lakes is located in the park. The park is a haven for migratory birds and wetland wildlife.

History
The park saw its inception in 1922, when the Michigan Conservation Commission accepted from Bay City a tract of land on the shore of Saginaw Bay with the proviso that the site become a state park. From 1923 until 1994, it was known as Bay City State Park. In 1994, when some  termed the Tobico Marsh were added to the park, the park took on the name of Bay City State Recreation Area, a move that confused both the populace and the media who continued to refer to by its original name. The name Bay City State Park was restored in 2017.

Activities and amenities
The park offers swimming, spray park, trails for hiking, biking and cross-country skiing, picnicking areas, playground, and camping. Park activities include fishing, hunting and trapping as well as wildlife viewing from observation towers, boardwalks, viewing platforms, and shoreline spotting scopes. The park's  Saginaw Bay Visitor Center includes an exhibit hall with interactive natural history displays, 100-seat auditorium, and year-round environmental education programs.

Beach pollution
Pollution on the beaches bordering the Saginaw Bay consisting of organic matter has been a significant issue to park patrons and local waterfront land owners in recent years. Although beach grooming has been implemented to clean up the beaches, much of the shoreline along the bay is muddied with muck.

Much of the pollution found along the bay shore has been attributed to waste runoff from local farms settled within the Saginaw River watershed, wastewater treatment failures, and leaking septic systems, which contribute nutrients into the water, causing algae blooms.

References

External links

 Bay City State Park Michigan Department of Natural Resources
 Bay City State Park Map Michigan Department of Natural Resources
 U.S. Geological Survey Map at the U.S. Geological Survey Map Website. Retrieved December 5th, 2022.

State parks of Michigan
Nature centers in Michigan
Saginaw Bay
Protected areas of Bay County, Michigan
Protected areas established in 1922